Uppsala Kurd FK is a Swedish football club located in Uppsala.

External links
 Profile at Uppsala
 Profile at Svenskalag

Footnotes

Football clubs in Uppsala County
Association football clubs established in 1947
1947 establishments in Sweden
Sport in Uppsala